Harry Joseph Hulihan (April 18, 1899 – September 11, 1980) was a former Major League Baseball pitcher. He played one season with the Boston Braves (1922).

References

External links

Boston Braves players
1899 births
1980 deaths
Baseball players from Vermont
Major League Baseball pitchers
Middlebury Panthers baseball players